The Messiah - Salabue Stradivarius of 1716 is a violin made by the Italian luthier Antonio Stradivari of Cremona. It is considered to be the only Stradivarius in existence in as new state. It is in the collection of the Ashmolean Museum in Oxford, England.

The violin, known as the Messiah (Messie in French), remained in Stradivari's workshop until his death in 1737. It was then sold by his son Paolo to Count Cozio di Salabue in 1775, and for a time, the violin bore the name Salabue. The instrument was then purchased by Luigi Tarisio in 1827. Upon Tarisio’s death, in 1854, the French luthier Jean Baptiste Vuillaume of Paris purchased The Messiah along with Tarisio's entire collection. "One day Tarisio was discoursing with Vuillaume on the merits of this unknown and marvelous instrument, when the violinist Jean-Delphin Alard, Vuillaume's son-in-law, exclaimed: 'Really, Mister Tarisio, your violin is like the Messiah of the Jews: one always expects him but he never appears' ('Vraiment, Monsieur Tarisio, votre violon est comme le Messie des Juifs: on l'attend toujours, mais il ne paraît jamais' ). Thus the violin was titled with the name by which it is still known."

The Messiah was bequeathed by the family of W.E. Hill to the Ashmolean Museum in Oxford for preservation as "a yardstick for future violin makers to learn from".

The violin is in like-new condition, as it was seldom played.  The tonal potential of the instrument has been questioned due to the conditions of the Hill bequest. However it was played by the famous violinist Joseph Joachim, who stated in a letter of 1891 to the then owner of the Messiah, Robert Crawford, that he was struck by the combined sweetness and grandeur of the sound. Nathan Milstein played it at the Hills' shop before 1940 and described it as an unforgettable experience. It is one of the most valuable of all the Stradivari instruments.

The top of the Messiah is made from the same tree as a P.G. Rogeri violin of 1710. The tuning pegs and the tailpiece (that shows the Nativity of Christ) are not original, but were added by Vuillaume.

See also
 List of Stradivarius instruments

References

External links 
  
 Messiah Stradivari

1716 works
Collection of the Ashmolean Museum
Stradivari violins
Stradivari instruments
Italy–United Kingdom relations
Individual musical instruments